The Death of Chatterton is an oil painting on canvas, by the English Pre-Raphaelite painter Henry Wallis (1830 - 1916), now in Tate Britain, London. Two smaller versions, sketches or replicas, are possessed by the Birmingham Museum and Art Gallery and the Yale Center for British Art.

The painting
The subject of the painting was the 17-year-old English early Romantic poet Thomas Chatterton (1752..1770), shown dead after he had poisoned himself with arsenic in 1770. Chatterton was considered a Romantic hero for many young and struggling artists in Wallis's time.

Wallis's Chatterton reveals his association with the Pre-Raphaelite style, seen in the vibrant colours and careful build-up of symbolic detail. He used a bold colour scheme with a contrasting palette and he exploited the fall of the natural light through the window of the garret to implement his much loved style at the time, chiaroscuro. Wallis painted the work in a friend's chamber in Gray's Inn, with St Paul's Cathedral on the skyline visible through the window. It was probably a coincidence that this location was close to the garret in Brooke Street where Chatterton died 86 years before. The model used for the painting was the young George Meredith, a 19th century English novelist and poet.

The painting was Wallis's first exhibited work. It was shown at the Royal Academy summer exhibition in 1856, with a quotation from the Tragedy of Doctor Faustus by Christopher Marlowe inscribed on the frame: "Cut is the branch that might have grown full straight, And burned is Apollo's laurel bough". It was an immediate success, with John Ruskin describing it as "faultless and wonderful". It drew large crowds at the Art Treasures Exhibition in Manchester in 1857, was also exhibited in Dublin in 1859, and was one of the most popular paintings of the 18th century in reproductive print form.

Wallis sold the painting to Augustus Egg in 1856, and Egg sold the right to make engraved reproductions. The painting became the subject of a court case after Dublin photographer James Robinson was inspired to recreate the painting as a tableau vivant so he could sell photographs of the scene. The painting was left to the Tate Gallery by Charles Gent Clement in 1899.

The Birmingham work was sold at Christie's in 1875 to Baron Albert Grant and then in 1877 to William Kendrick, who donated it to the gallery in 1918.

Inspirations
The main singer of the group Feu! Chatterton said that he was inspired by this painting for the name of the group.

References

1856 paintings
Paintings by Henry Wallis
Collection of the Tate galleries
Collections of Birmingham Museum and Art Gallery
Paintings in the Yale Center for British Art
Pre-Raphaelite paintings
Paintings about suicide